Miss America's Outstanding Teen 2012 is the 7th Miss America's Outstanding Teen pageant held at the Linda Chapin Theater in the Orange County Convention Center in Orlando, Florida on August 20, 2011. Lacey Russ of Oklahoma crowned her successor Elizabeth Fecthel of Florida at the end of the event. Miss America 2011 Teresa Scanlan was an emcee for the pageant.

Results

Placements

Awards

Preliminary Awards

Other Awards

Contestants

References

2012
August 2012 events in the United States
2011 in Florida